The sixth season of American Dad! aired on Fox from September 27, 2009, to May 16, 2010. The season consists of nine episodes from production line four (4AJNxx) and nine from production line five (5AJNxx). The entire season was released in the Volume Five DVD box set on April 19, 2011 in Region 1; on June 27, 2008 in Region 2; and July 13, 2008 in Region 4. The season also marked the series move to airing in 16:9 high definition on January 3, 2010 with the episode "Don't Look a Smith Horse in the Mouth".

The season initially ended its 13-episode run on February 21 with the episode "The Return of the Bling" to make room for the new Fox sitcom Sons of Tucson and was set to return to the schedule in September. However, on April 5, it was announced that Sons of Tucson was canceled after a four-episode run. The sixth season of American Dad continued with five more episodes.

The season premiered in the United Kingdom, on BBC Three on Sunday, November 6, 2011 at 10 pm, with a double bill (despite the fact it already was on FX).


Episode list

Reception
The season premiere, "In Country…Club", was given generally positive reviews.

References
General
 
Specific

External links

2009 American television seasons
2010 American television seasons